David Faulkner (born June 27, 1968) is an American politician who has served in the Alabama House of Representatives from the 46th district since 2014.

References

1968 births
Living people
Republican Party members of the Alabama House of Representatives
21st-century American politicians